Several police buildings in Hong Kong are listed as historic monuments. While some of them are still serving their initial purpose, most of them have been decommissioned and have been redeveloped or are awaiting redevelopment.

Historic police stations
Historic police stations include:

Demolished police stations

Historic police quarters

MacIntosh Forts

See also

 History of Hong Kong Police
 Adaptive reuse
 Heritage conservation in Hong Kong
 History of Hong Kong (1800s–1930s)

References

 
Monuments and memorials in Hong Kong